Bermuda national basketball team represents Bermuda in international competitions. It is administrated by the Bermuda Basketball Association (BBA).

Despite Bermuda's very small population, its basketball team has qualified for the Caribbean Basketball Championship twice. At this event, Bermuda left behind competition from countries such as Guyana, which has more than ten times Bermuda's population size.

Roster
2018 Squad 

Team for the 2015 FIBA CBC Championship.

Competitions

Performance at FIBA AmeriCup
yet to qualify

Performance at Caribbean Championship
2000 : -
2002 : -
2004 : -
2006 : -
2007 : -
2009 : 8th
2011 : 5th
2014 : -
2015 : 8th

Commonwealth Games

never participated

Head coach position
 Roderick Spencer – 2002-2016  
 Gavin MacKenzie -2016-

References

External links
Bermuda Basketball Association
Presentation at CaribbeanBasketball.com
Archived records of Bermuda team participations
LatinBasket - Bermuda Men National Team
Presentation on Facebook

Videos
 Bermuda v Surinam - Group B - 2015 CBC Championship Youtube.com video

Basketball in Bermuda
Men's national basketball teams
Basketball
1998 establishments in Bermuda